Azizullah (born 11 September 1993) is a Pakistani first-class cricketer who played for Sui Northern Gas Pipelines Limited.

References

External links
 

1993 births
Living people
Pakistani cricketers
Baluchistan cricketers
Sui Northern Gas Pipelines Limited cricketers
Place of birth missing (living people)